Christodoulos Christodoulides (born August 22, 1976) is a Cypriot judoka who won the silver medal at the 2002 Commonwealth Games. In the final he was defeated by the Australian Tom Hill. He also represented Cyprus at the 2004 Summer Olympics in the 73 kg class, but was eliminated by the Portuguese João Neto in the first round. Over his career, he won seven gold medals (two of them as part of a team) for Cyprus in the Games of the Small States of Europe: in 1995, 1997, 1999, 2001, 2003 and 2009.

He was placed 5th and 7th in the Mediterranean Games 1997 and 2001, 7th in the European Men's Championships 2003 in Maribor, Slovenia, and 9th in the World Men's Championship 2003 in Osaka, Japan. In 2004, he was 11th placed in the World Rank List for 73kg men.

He is the only Cypriot Judoka who has won all categories in the National Championships, from 60kg to +100kg.

He is now 5th IJF Dan and he is the Technical Director of the Cyprus Judo Federation.

Achievements

References

1976 births
Living people
Cypriot male judoka
Judoka at the 2004 Summer Olympics
Olympic judoka of Cyprus
Judoka at the 2002 Commonwealth Games
Commonwealth Games silver medallists for Cyprus
Commonwealth Games medallists in judo
Medallists at the 2002 Commonwealth Games